The Ball ( "ball" in the sense of a football) is a 1958 Romanian drama film directed by Andrei Blaier and . It was entered into the 1st Moscow International Film Festival. In the Romania of the 1930s the economic crisis has serious impact on society. A teacher is fired from work and fights to make ends meet, while his paralyzed son dreams of a soccer ball with which to play. The father falls in with communist activists, one of whom helps him find a ball for his son.

Cast
  as the Father
 Ion Bodeanu as Ionel
  as Chiriță
  as the Policeman
 Ion Ulmeni as the High School Principal
  as the wife of Chiriță

References

External links
 

1958 films
1958 drama films
1950s Romanian-language films
Films directed by Andrei Blaier
Romanian drama films

Films about communism
Great Depression films